"Love Power" is a song by American singers Dionne Warwick and Jeffrey Osborne. It was written and produced by Burt Bacharach and Carole Bayer Sager for Warwick's studio album, Reservations for Two (1987), and features an appearance by Kenny G playing the alto sax solo. Released as its lead singe, it became Warwick's sixth number-one hit on the  US Billboard Adult Contemporary chart. The track also reached number 12 on the Billboard Hot 100. "Love Power" marked her final appearance in the top 40 on the latter chart. For Osborne, "Love Power" was his  only number-one Adult Contemporary hit, and it would be his last appearance in the Billboard Hot 100 as well, since "She's On the Left," his only number-one R&B hit, would only reach number 48 on that same chart the following year.

Track listings

Personnel 
Credits lifted from the liner notes of Reservations for Two.

Musicians
 Dionne Warwick – lead vocals
 Jeffrey Osborne – lead vocals
 Kenny G – alto saxophone solo
 Greg Phillinganes – keyboards
 David Foster – synthesizers
 Burt Bacharach – additional synthesizers
 Robbie Buchanan – additional synthesizers
 David Boruff – synthesizer programming
 Dann Huff – guitars
 Nathan East – bass
 Carlos Vega – drums
 Tim Feehan – backing vocals
 Joe Pizzulo – backing vocals

Production
 Clive Davis – executive producer
 Burt Bacharach – producer
 Carole Bayer Sager – producer
 Frank DeCaro – musical contractor
 Mick Guzauski – engineer, mixing
 Daren Klein – additional engineer
 Tommy Vicari – additional engineer
 Marnie Riley – assistant engineer
 Gary Wagner – assistant engineer
 Bernie Grundman – mastering
 Maude Gilman – art direction
 Ann Petter – design
 Harry Langdon – photography
 Luiz Archer – fashion stylist
 Clifford Peterson – hairdresser
 Wynona Price – make–up

Charts

References

1987 singles
1987 songs
Dionne Warwick songs
Jeffrey Osborne songs
Songs with music by Burt Bacharach
Songs written by Carole Bayer Sager
Male–female vocal duets